The Episcopal Diocese of Olympia, also known as the Episcopal Church in Western Washington, is a diocese of the Episcopal Church in Washington state west of the Cascade Range. It is one of 17 dioceses and an area mission that make up Province 8. The diocese started as a missionary district in 1853 and was formally established in 1910. It comprises 25,490 members in 92 congregations.

The name of the diocese refers to the region of "Olympia" and is not related to the state capital Olympia. The see city is Seattle, with St. Mark's the cathedral church of the diocese. Following the resignation of Greg Rickel (the eighth bishop of Olympia) on December 31, 2022 the diocese is led by Melissa M. Skelton as bishop provisional.

Bishops

These are the bishops who have served the territory now known as the Diocese of Olympia:

Missionary Bishops

Bishops of Oregon and Washington territories
 Thomas Fielding Scott (1854–1867)
 Benjamin Wistar Morris (1868–1880)

Bishops of Washington state
 John A. Paddock (1880–1894)
 William Morris Barker (1894–1901)
 Frederick W. Keator (1902–1910)

Bishops of Olympia
 Frederick W. Keator (1910–1924)
 S. Arthur Huston (1925–1947)
 Stephen F. Bayne, Jr. (1947–1960)
 William F. Lewis (1960–1964)
 Ivol Ira Curtis (1964–1976)
 Robert H. Cochrane (1976–1989)
 Vincent Waydell Warner, Jr. (1990–2007)• Sanford Zangwill Kaye Hampton, assisting bishop• Bavi Edna Rivera, bishop suffragan (2006–2009)
 Gregory Rickel (2007–2022)• Melissa M. Skelton, bishop provisional (2023–present)

Huston Camp and Conference Center
The Diocese owns a summer camp located in Gold Bar, WA next to the Wallace Falls State Park. Director Bill Tubbs for the last 20 years has overseen operation of both the Conference and Summer Camp seasons.

See also

 List of Succession of Bishops for the Episcopal Church, USA

References

External links
Official Web site of the Episcopal Church
Episcopal Diocese of Olympia website
St. Mark's Episcopal Cathedral
Huston Camp and Conference Center website

Olympia
Christianity in Washington (state)
 
Christian organizations established in 1910
1910 establishments in Washington (state)
Province 8 of the Episcopal Church (United States)